Hyposmocoma fuscopurpurata is a species of moth of the family Cosmopterigidae. It was first described by Elwood Zimmerman in 1978. It is endemic to the Hawaiian island of Oahu. The type locality is Mount Olympus.

External links

fuscopurpurata
Endemic moths of Hawaii
Moths described in 1978